Yanagawa is a Japanese surname. Notable people with the surname include:

Akira Yanagawa (born 1971), Japanese motorcycle racer
Harumi Yanagawa, Japanese athlete
Heisuke Yanagawa (1879-1945), Japanese general
Kimie Yanagawa (1915-1997), Japanese-American educator
Masaki Yanagawa (born 1987), Japanese footballer
Yanagawa Shigenobu (1787-1932), Japanese painter

Japanese-language surnames